Say-Field-Coldwell syndrome is a very rare genetic disorder which consists of triphalangeal thumbs, brachydactyly, camptodactyly, regular dislocation of the patella and short stature. Only one affected woman and her (also affected) three daughters have been described in medical literature.

References 

Genetic diseases and disorders
Congenital disorders of musculoskeletal system
Syndromes affecting stature
Rare genetic syndromes